The Parapsychological Association Outstanding Career Award is an award given by the Parapsychological Association to those whom it recognizes as having "sustained (20 years or more) research or service contributions that have advanced the discipline of parapsychology".

List of awardees 

1988 Gertrude R. Schmeidler
1989 Robert A. McConnell
1990 Dorothy H. Pope
1991 John Beloff
1992 Jule Eisenbud
1993 Karlis Osis
1994 Emilio Servadio
1995 Alan Gauld
1996 William G. Roll
1997 Erlendur Haraldsson
1998 Stanley Krippner
1999 Charles T. Tart
2000 Piero Cassoli
2001 Eileen Coly
2002 Remy Chauvin
2003 None given
2004 None given
2005 Robert L. Morris
2006 Joop Houtkooper
2007 Ed May
2008 Mario P. Varvoglis
2009 Russell Targ
 2010 Sally Rhine Feather
 2011 Richard Broughton
 2012 John A. Palmer
 2013 Eberhard Bauer
 2014 Deborah Delanoy
 2015 Gerd H. Hövelmann

References 

Career awards
Parapsychology